The Grand Prix Velo Alanya is an annual professional road bicycle racing for and women in Turkey.

Winners

Classification leaders jerseys

References

Cycle races in Turkey
Recurring sporting events established in 2018
2018 establishments in Turkey
Women's road bicycle races
Annual sporting events in Turkey